George Olmsted may refer to:

 George H. Olmsted (1901–1998), American military officer and insurance executive
 George W. Olmsted (1874–1940), founded the Long Island Lighting Company in 1911